TSS North Wall was a twin screw steamer cargo vessel operated by the London and North Western Railway (LNWR) from 1883 to 1904.

History

She was built by Robert Duncan and Company of Port Glasgow for the London and North Western Railway in 1883 as a cargo vessel. She is notable as the first screw propulsion vessel acquired by the London and North Western Railway.  She operated on the Holyhead, Wales to Dublin, Ireland route.

Her name North Wall reflected the LNWR's terminus in Dublin.

She was scrapped in 1904.

References

1883 ships
Steamships
Ships built on the River Clyde
Ships of the London and North Western Railway